is a Japanese television jidaigeki or period drama, that was broadcast in 1973–1974. It is the third in the Hissatsu series and is based on Saga Sen's Seibei-ryū Gokui.

Plot
Seibie used to be a famous bandit. Now  Seibie's official job is an employment agency but also he takes charge of killing villains with money. Seibie's targets are always villains who escape justice despite their crimes.

Skilled swordsman Nakayama Bunjuro and Tsji Heinai work for him. At first Ryu tries to kill Seibie but he also starts working for him.

Cast
Takahiro Tamura as Nakayama Bunjurō
Ichirō Nakatani as Tsuji Heinai
Sō Yamamura as Daiku no Seibe
Hiroshi Miyauchi as Ryu (From episode 20)
Yumiko Nogawa as Okichi
Masahiro Sumiyoshi as Tamekichi
Masaaki Tsusaka as Rikichi
Atsuko Sano as Nakayama Shino

Directors
Koreyoshi Kurahara Episode1,6,13,14,21,22,35,36
Kenji Misumi Episode3,7,8,12,33 
Eiichi Kudo Episode4,11,29,30
Tokuzō Tanaka Episode18,19,23,24,28,31,34

See also
 Hissatsu Shikakenin (First in the Hissatsu series) 
 Hissatsu Shiokinin  (2nd in the Hissatsu series) 
 Hissatsu Shiokiya Kagyō   (6th in the Hissatsu series)
 Shin Hissatsu Shiokinin (10th in the Hissatsu series)

References

1973 Japanese television series debuts
1970s drama television series
Jidaigeki television series